Marcus Gilbert may refer to:

 Marcus Gilbert (actor) (born 1958), British actor
 Marcus Gilbert (American football) (born 1988)
 Marcus Gilbert (basketball)